Eshpeu (Yurok:  'Espew  ) is a former Yurok settlement in Humboldt County, California. It was located at Gold Bluff between the mouths of the Klamath River and Redwood Creek.  Espa Lagoon is near the site of Eshpeu.

References

Former settlements in Humboldt County, California
Former Native American populated places in California
Yurok villages